Moorella glycerini  is a thermophilic, homoacetogenic, anaerobic and endospore-forming bacterium from the genus Moorella, which has been isolated from a hot spring from the Calcite Spring area from the Yellowstone National Park in the United States. This microorganism utilizes glycerol as a growth substrate and is considered Gram-positive type.

References

 

Thermoanaerobacterales
Bacteria described in 1997
Thermophiles
Anaerobes
Acetogens